Knucklas railway station serves the village of Knucklas, Powys, Wales,  south west of Shrewsbury.

This railway station is located on a steep hill above the village. It is a request stop, so intending passengers have to signal to the driver that they wish to board the train, while those wishing to alight from the train must convey their wish to the train staff.

After departing from the station in the westerly direction, trains pass over the 190 yd (173 m) long Knucklas viaduct.  This is one of the major structures on the route, its 13 stone arches carrying the line at a maximum height of 75 feet (23 m) across the Heyope valley and Knucklas village. The route then climbs sharply from east to west for the next 4 miles (6.4 km) on a ruling gradient of 1 in 60, en route to the summit of the line just to the south of Llangynllo Tunnel.

All trains serving the station are operated by Transport for Wales.

Facilities
The station is unstaffed and has no remaining permanent buildings aside from a brick and timber waiting shelter. Other amenities offered include CIS screen, customer help point, public telephone and timetable poster board. Step-free access is available from the car park and entry road from the adjoining residential estate, though the access ramp is quite steep.

Services
There are four trains a day to Swansea southbound and five to Shrewsbury northbound from Monday to Friday (four on Saturdays), along with two services each way on Sundays.

References

Further reading

External links 

Railway stations in Powys
DfT Category F2 stations
Former London and North Western Railway stations
Railway stations in Great Britain opened in 1865
Heart of Wales Line
Railway stations served by Transport for Wales Rail
Railway request stops in Great Britain